Leybourne is a small village and civil parish in Kent, England situated off Junction 4 of the M20 Motorway. Leybourne is adjacent to New Hythe, Larkfield and West Malling. As of 2020 Leybourne Parish had a population of 4,372.

Historically, the area was extensively quarried, leaving a number of flooded gravel pits. These have recently been developed into Leybourne Lakes Country Park, and a housing development. Several of the houses on the development feature in the Channel 4 TV Series Cape Wrath. Nearby New Hythe was also home (until 2004) of Meridian's newsroom and studio for the South East. Leybourne's name is the origin of that of the French city Libourne.

History of the church 
Despite its small size, Leybourne Church has a long history. The church was built in Saxon times but the church building was changed greatly in 1874. The Leybourne history started when the ancestor of the Leybourne family came over with William the Conqueror from France. He was granted land by William I in Yorkshire and lived there with his family for a long time. His descendant, Sir Philip Libourne, decided to live in a village in Kent called Lillieburn. The names mixed to call the place Leybourne. He built Leybourne Castle and was the first baron of Leybourne; his new name was Sir Philip Baron de Leybourne. Two people who were quite important were barons of Leybourne. The first, the baron of Leybourne, Sir Roger de Leybourne who was the great grandson of Philip, was good friends with Prince Edward (later to become Edward I). In 1270 he set off with Edward on a crusade to the Holy Land. On the way he was ill so was sent back; in France on the way to Leybourne he died. His heart was sent back to Leybourne and put in the left-hand side box of the niche; the one on the right is empty.  The second is Sir William Baron de Leybourne, son of Sir Roger, who was the first Englishman to have the title admiral. On 25 October 1286 King Edward I and Queen Eleanor of Castille visited William at Leybourne Castle. They left two crowns as gifts, which hang above the wooden plaque about Sir William, which was unveiled in 1956 by Richard Talbot.
In the church tower there used to be three bells, but now there is only one. It is because the tower collapsed in 1580; they then only restored two bells. Then in Friday 10 June 1966 a bolt of lightning hit the tower and it caught fire, then they decided only to have one bell. The tower was Norman, but in 1874, architect Sir Arthur Blomfeld encased it in an extra layer of wall.

The Domesday Book says about Leybourne: 
"Adam holds Leybourne of the bishop. It is assessed at 2 sulungs. There is land               . In demesne are 3 ploughs; and 16 villains with 2 bordars have 7 ploughs. There is a church, and 10 slaves, and 1 mill rendering 7s, and 12 acres of meadow, woodland for 50 pigs. In the time of King Edward it was worth £8; when received, £7; now £8. Richard of Tonbridge holds in his lowy what is worth 24s. The king holds as a recent gift from the bishop what is worth 24s2d. Thorgisl holds this manor of Earl Godwine."

The blank entry above is as shown in the Domesday Book; either it was left blank for future addition, or the original entry was erased.

Amenities
Leybourne has a primary school, pre Norman-conquest church, 13th-century castle (dating back to Norman times), hairdressers, shop, newsagent and general store, village hall, pub/restaurant (The Old Rectory) and a Brewers Fayre restaurant and motel.

Leybourne and the neighbouring town of West Malling elect three councillors to Tonbridge and Malling Borough Council. It also has its own Parish Council.

There are junior football teams aging from Under 6's to Under 18's and also a cricket club for adults and children on the school premises: Leybourne St Peter and St Paul Church of England Primary school (Voluntary aided).

Nearby Leybourne Lakes Country Park offer fishing, scenic walking and cycle paths plus water sports such as windsurfing and scuba diving.

In the 2000s the new settlement of Leybourne Chase was developed in the west of the parish, on the former Leybourne Grange mental hospital site.

Bypass
In mid-2005 work was started on the Leybourne bypass to handle the additional traffic from nearby Kings Hill. The bypass was opened late in October 2006, with the aim of reducing traffic coming off the motorway and through Leybourne along Castle Way.

Leybourne Woods
Leybourne Woods is a small area of wood & heathland set between the communities of Leybourne and West Malling in Kent.
Used by local residents for dog walking, leisure walks, running, mountain bike & horse riding the woods also conceal an amazing amount of wildlife.

References

External links

A228 Bypass Info
Parish Council
Leybourne church

Villages in Kent
Civil parishes in Kent